Yolanda Mangadil-Soemarno (born 30 July 1946) is a former tennis player.

Born in North Sulawesi, Soemarno played Federation Cup tennis for Indonesia between 1976 and 1981. She was the singles gold medalist at the 1977 Southeast Asian Games and won a team bronze medal at the 1978 Asian Games.

Soemarno's son (Aga) and one of her daughters (Tanya) were both professional tennis players.

References

External links
 
 
 

1946 births
Living people
Indonesian female tennis players
Medalists at the 1978 Asian Games
Asian Games medalists in tennis
Asian Games bronze medalists for Indonesia
Tennis players at the 1978 Asian Games
Competitors at the 1977 Southeast Asian Games
Competitors at the 1979 Southeast Asian Games
Competitors at the 1981 Southeast Asian Games
Southeast Asian Games medalists in tennis
Southeast Asian Games gold medalists for Indonesia
Southeast Asian Games silver medalists for Indonesia
Southeast Asian Games bronze medalists for Indonesia
Sportspeople from North Sulawesi
20th-century Indonesian women